James Alexander Elphinstone, 18th Lord Elphinstone and 4th Baron Elphinstone, AssocRICS (22 April 1953 – 19 December 1994), was a British nobleman, farmer, and financier.

Early life and family 
Lord Elphinstone was the son of Rev. Hon. Andrew Charles Victor Elphinstone and Jean Frances Hambro. His paternal grandparents were Sidney Buller-Fullerton-Elphinstone, 16th Lord Elphinstone, and the former Lady Mary Bowes-Lyon, elder sister of Queen Elizabeth The Queen Mother.

He was educated at Eton College and the Royal Agricultural College.

He was a Professional Associate of the Royal Institution of Chartered Surveyors.

Personal life 
On 22 April 1978, Lord Elphinstone married Willa Mary Gabrielle Chetwode, daughter of Major George David Chetwode and Lady Willa Elliot-Murray-Kynynmound (herself the daughter of Victor Elliot-Murray-Kynynmound, 5th Earl of Minto, and his wife, Marion Cook). The couple had four children:
 Alexander Mountstuart Elphinstone, 19th Lord Elphinstone (b. 15 April 1980); married Nicola J. Hall on 7 July 2007. They have three children. 
 The Honorable Angus John Elphinstone (b. 1982) married Isobel L. Smith on 15 June 2013. They have three children:
 Albie James Elphinstone (6 August 2015)
 Edie Dree Elphinstone (11 September 2018)
 Sienna Grace Elphinstone (23 February 2021)
 The Honorable Fergus David Elphinstone (b. 1985) married Rosie Davies in 2016. They have one son.
 Hamish Frederick Elphinstone (2017)
 The Honorable Clementina Rose Elphinstone (b. 1989) married Oliver William Salusbury Harrison on 30 October 2020.

He was succeeded in his titles by his eldest son, Alexander.

References 

1953 births
1994 deaths
English people of Dutch descent
Barons in the Peerage of the United Kingdom
De Peyster family
Schuyler family
Van Cortlandt family
James
People educated at Eton College
Alumni of the Royal Agricultural University
18